Home is an experimental pop band formed in Tampa, Florida in the early-1990s, before relocating to New York in 1996. The band released eight self-produced, sequentially numbered, ultra-low-distribution albums on cheap Radio Shack cassettes before signing to Sony's Relativity Records label, which distributed its ninth album (appropriately titled IX) in 1995. This album, Home's only release on a major label, received favorable reviews in publications such as Spin, The Village Voice and Magnet. Subsequent Home albums have appeared on independent record labels, also to generally positive reviews. Dave Fridmann of The Flaming Lips was the producer behind at least two of Home's albums.

Though Home was originally regarded as a lo-fi band due to its primitive recording techniques, its releases starting with IX have largely featured a cleaner sound highlighted by guitars and various electronic keyboards. In reviewing IX, The Village Voice observed that Home's sound resembles bands from "the late '80s (Sebadoh, Grifters) and mid-70s (Devo, Faust, David Bowie) sprinkled with enough influences out of the bargain-bins (Elton John, Gong, David Bowie) to push the taste-envelope a smidgen closer to both prog-art and schmaltz-rock." That album received a 7-out-of-10 rating from Spin. A year later, describing the band's independent album Elf: Gulf Bore Waltz, The Chicago Tribune wrote: "Laboring in the rock 'n' roll hinterland of Florida, the band Home has developed a refreshingly scattershot sound that wanders erratically through folky balladry, prog rock, ragged pop, and unclassifiable experimentation. Though somewhat reminiscent of indie rock obscurantists like Pavement, Home is both more ambitious and more consistently tuneful than many of its trendier peers."

Less charitably, The Trouser Press Record Guide opined: "When intently focused, Home can squeeze an agreeably synthetic, Devo-esque poptone (like 'Make It Right') from its gizmos. More often, though, Home lapses into wildly freeform freakouts (like 'Atomique') that combine electronic noise, found sound and even a bit of spoken word. ... Those endowed with short attention spans will no doubt have the easiest time making it all the way through IX."

The members of Home also helped found the Screw Music Forever record label and music collective. Besides releasing Home's own 7-inch singles, Screw Music also has released recordings by related bands such as Dumbwaiters, Pee Shy, Leels and the 100% Storms Ensemble.

Home's 16th album, Sexteen, which the band describes as "a concept record about fucking," was released in 2006. This album also marked the end of the band's longstanding relationship with its European label, Cooking Vinyl. During the same year, members of Home performed under the name Home Hunters during the Come The Freak On music festival at Bombshell Gallery in St. Petersburg, Florida.

Home appeared on This Is Next Year: A Brooklyn-Based Compilation  - Arena Rock Recording Co. - 2001

As of late 2006, Home was making preparations for its next album, Seventeen, envisioned as the soundtrack to a movie that the band members were simultaneously preparing to film.

Members
Brad Truax - Bass
Andrew Deutsch - Guitar
Chris Millstein - Drums
Eric Morrison - Piano
Sean Martin - Drums, Guitar

Discography
I self-released cassette, 1992
II self-released cassette
III self-released cassette
IV self-released cassette
V self-released cassette
VI self-released cassette
VII self-released cassette
VIII self-released 8-track cassette
IX compact disc (Relativity Records), 1995
X compact disc (Emperor Jones), 1996
Elf: Gulf Bore Waltz compact disc (Jetset), 1996
XII Internet-only release at Screw Music Forever, 2005
13:Netherregions compact disc (Jetset), 1997
XIV compact disc (Arena Rock Recording Co.), 1999
XV compact disc (Cooking Vinyl), 2003
Sexteen compact disc (Brah Records), 2006

References

External links
Screw Music Forever - website for the band's label
Home on Myspace

Brah Records
Arena Rock Recording Co.

Indie rock musical groups from Florida
Arena Rock Recording Company artists